The lieutenant governor is the second-highest-ranking government official in 45 of the 50 U.S. states and four of the five territories. In those states and territories, it is the first in the line of succession in case of a vacancy in the office of governor (note: in Massachusetts and West Virginia, the lieutenant governor succeeds 'only' as acting governor), while in the remaining states and territories another office holds that status. Currently, 26 states elect a lieutenant governor on a ticket with the governor, while 17 states elect a lieutenant governor separately. In West Virginia, the president of the Senate, as elected by the State Senators, serves as the state's lieutenant governor. In Tennessee, the State Senators elect a Speaker of the Senate, who in turn serves as lieutenant governor. Five states do not have a lieutenant governor.

List of lieutenant governors by state
In the table below, "term ends" indicates the year the current lieutenant governor will leave office; a notation (term limits) after the year indicates that the current lieutenant governor is ineligible to seek re-election in that year. A notation of (retiring) after the year indicates that the current lieutenant governor is leaving office that year, having not sought re-election. A notation of (defeated) indicates that the current lieutenant governor was defeated for re-election.

List of lieutenant governors by territory

States which do not have lieutenant governors 
Five states do not have a position of an official lieutenant governor. In these cases, the secretary of state or the president of the Senate is next in line for the governorship.

Federal district and territories which do not have lieutenant governors or deputy mayors 
One territory, Puerto Rico, places the secretary of state next in line for the governorship. In the District of Columbia, the chairman of the Council of the District of Columbia is first in line of succession in the event of a vacancy in the office of mayor of the District of Columbia.

States and territories with differing party membership at the executive level 
In most states or territories, the governor and lieutenant governor are members of the same political party. In the following states, the designated successor to the governorship is of a different political party than the governor:

See also
 List of current United States first spouses
 List of current United States governors
 List of current United States lieutenant governors by age
 List of female lieutenant governors in the United States
 List of minority governors and lieutenant governors in the United States

Notes

References

 
Lieutenant governors
United States lieutenant governors